The Listvianskaya Coal Mine is a coal mine located in Novosibirsk Oblast. The mine has coal reserves amounting to 895 million tonnes of coking coal, one of the largest coal reserves in Russia and the world and has an annual production of 5 million tonnes of coal.

References 

Coal mines in Russia
Buildings and structures in Novosibirsk Oblast